Horringer Court Caves is a  biological Site of Special Scientific Interest on the southern outskirts of Bury St Edmunds in Suffolk.

This site has over 500 metres of chalk mines, with five grilled entrances, which are used by bats for hibernation. They have been the subject of research since 1947. The main bats using the caves are Daubenton's, but other species include the very rare barbastelle, which have been recorded eight times in 36 years.

This site in the grounds of a hotel is private property.

References

Sites of Special Scientific Interest in Suffolk
Bury St Edmunds